Guitar Monsters is an album by Chet Atkins and Les Paul, released in 1978. It is their second collaboration, after their Grammy Award-winning release Chester & Lester.

At the Grammy Awards of 1978, Guitar Monsters was nominated for the Grammy Award for Best Instrumental Performance.

Reception

Writing for Allmusic, critic Richard S. Ginell recalled the success of the duo's first collaboration and wrote of this album "the results are just about as marvelous."

Reissues
 Guitar Monsters and Chester and Lester were released on CD in 1989 by Pair Records as Masters of the Guitar: Together with some tracks omitted.
 Both albums were re-released with the two albums intact on one CD in 1998 by One Way Records.

Track listing

Side one
 "Limehouse Blues" (Philip Braham, Douglas Furber) - 2:50
 "I Want to Be Happy" (Caesar, Youmans) - 3:41
 "Over the Rainbow" (Harold Arlen, E.Y. Harburg) - 2:41
 "Meditation" (Antonio Carlos Jobim)  - 2:32
 "Lazy River" (Hoagy Carmichael, Sidney Arodin ) - 3:01
 "I'm Your Greatest Fan" - 3:49

Side two
 "It Don't Mean a Thing (If it Ain't Got That Swing)" (Duke Ellington, Irving Mills) - 2:58
 "I Surrender Dear" (Harry Barris, Gordon Clifford) - 4:04
 "Brazil" (Ary Barroso, Russell) - 2:41
 "Give My Love to Nell" (Traditional) - 2:53
 "Hot Toddy" (Ralph Flanagan) - 3:00

Personnel
Chet Atkins – guitar
Les Paul – guitar
Joe Osborne – bass
Buddy Harman, Larrie Londin, Randy Hauser – drums
Randy Goodrum – piano
Paul Yandell – rhythm guitar

References

1978 albums
Chet Atkins albums
Albums produced by Bob Ferguson (music)
RCA Records albums
Les Paul albums
Collaborative albums